Wilhelm Moritz Egon Freiherr von Gayl (4 February 1879 – 7 November 1945) was a German jurist and politician of the German National People's Party (DNVP).

Biography
Gayl was born in Königsberg, capital of the Prussian province of East Prussia (today Kaliningrad, Russia) and studied law at the universities of Berlin, Göttingen and Bonn. In 1909 he became the director of the Ostpreussische Landgesellschaft, a settlement society for East Prussia
.

He served throughout the First World War, initially as an officer on active service, and was decorated with the Iron Cross first class, but soon joined the administration of Ober Ost as Supreme Commander of All German Forces in the East. In 1916 he became Chief of the Department of interior politics and administration of Ober Ost and on 1 September 1918 Landeshauptmann ("State Captain") of northern Lithuania at Kaunas.

In 1919 Gayl was a member of the German delegation at the Versailles conference and became the German Commissioner for the  throughout the East Prussian plebiscite in 1920.

Gayl was a member of the Prussian State Council in 1921-33 and was the East Prussian deputy at the Reichsrat in 1921-32.

On 1 June 1932 Gayl became the Secretary of Interior of Franz von Papen's "Cabinet of Barons" implemented by President Paul von Hindenburg according to Article 48. One of the first actions as a minister was to establish an obligatory program at every Reichs-Rundfunk-Gesellschaft broadcasting company called the "hour of the government". Every day between 6:30 and 7:30 p.m. the companies had to provide 30 minutes of transmission time for representatives of the government. Papen used this opportunity eighteen times in the six months of his term in office while he never spoke at the Weimar German Parliament

Gayl was one of the initiators of the Preußenschlag against the Social Democratic government in Prussia in June 1932 but strongly opposed any cooperation with Hitler's Nazi Party. Instead Gayl supported Carl Schmitt's concept of a constitutional state of emergency (Staatsnotstand) and supposed to implement a pure presidential government by a dissolution of the Reichstag without the appointment of elections within 60 days as provided by the Weimar German Constitution.

After Chancellor von Papen had resigned on 17 November, Gayl lost his position with the appointment of Kurt von Schleicher's cabinet on 3 December 1932. He died in Potsdam shortly after the end of World War II.

Publications
 Ostpreußen unter fremden Flaggen - Ein Erinnerungsbuch an die ostpreußische Volksabstimmung vom 11. Juli 1920, Königsberg 1940.

Literature
 Wolfgang von der Groeben: Verzeichnis der Mitglieder des Corps Saxonia zu Göttingen 1844 bis 2006, Düsseldorf 2006

Notes

References

External links
 

1879 births
1945 deaths
German National People's Party politicians
People from the Province of Prussia
Jurists from Königsberg
German Army personnel of World War I
Barons of Germany
University of Göttingen alumni
University of Bonn alumni
Prussian politicians
Politicians from Königsberg